Moira Lindsay Maguire  Walls (born 4 May 1952), is a Scottish former high jumper, long jumper and pentathlete. She won a bronze medal in the high jump at the 1970 British Commonwealth Games in Edinburgh. She competed at the 1976 Summer Olympics.

Personal life
Walls is from Milngavie near Glasgow, Scotland. Her daughter Lindsey Maguire competed for Great Britain in rowing at the 2012 Summer Olympics in London.

Career
Walls was a member of Edinburgh Southern Harriers athletics club. Walls competed in the high jump event at the 1970 British Commonwealth Games in Edinburgh. She won the bronze medal, and is the only Scottish high jumper to have won a Commonwealth Games medal. In 1970, she had the best performance by a European in a long jump competition, after jumping . She was also ranked number two in Europe for pentathlon, and in the top six in Europe for the high jump.

Walls competed in the high jump at the 1976 Summer Olympics in Montreal, finishing 31st. She was the first Scottish woman to clear a height of over 6 foot.

Awards
Walls was a winner of the 1969 BBC Scotland Sports Personality of the Year award, along with Bernard Gallacher.

References

External links
 Sports Reference

1952 births
Living people
Sportspeople from Glasgow
Scottish female high jumpers
Scottish female long jumpers
British pentathletes
Athletes (track and field) at the 1976 Summer Olympics
Olympic athletes of Great Britain
Athletes (track and field) at the 1970 British Commonwealth Games
Commonwealth Games bronze medallists for Scotland
Commonwealth Games medallists in athletics
Medallists at the 1970 British Commonwealth Games